Constantine Charles Henry Phipps, 3rd Marquess of Normanby DL (29 August 1846 – 25 August 1932) was a Canon of Windsor from 1891 to 1907.

Family
He was born on 29 August 1846, the eldest son of George Phipps, 2nd Marquess of Normanby and Laura Russell.
 
On the death of his father on 3 April 1890, he succeeded to the title of Marquess of Normanby, having previously been styled Earl of Mulgrave.

On 30 December 1903, he married Gertrude Stansfeld Foster, OBE, DGStJ, daughter of Johnston Jonas Foster, of Moor Park, Ludlow, Shropshire. They had the following children:
Lady Katharine Phipps (b. 7 January 1905, died 1960), married to Roy Amon Harding
Lady (Gertrude) Elizabeth Phipps (b. 30 April 1908, died 1985), married to Admiral Sir William Davis
Oswald Constantine John Phipps, 4th Marquess of Normanby (29 July 1912 – 30 January 1994)

He was succeeded in the title by his son Oswald Phipps, 4th Marquess of Normanby.  His widow died on 12 March 1948.

Career
He was educated at University of Durham and was awarded an MA. He was ordained by the Archbishop of York in 1870.  In addition to his ecclesiastical positions, he was also Lieutenant-Colonel of the North Riding Volunteer Regiment.

He was subsequently appointed:
Assistant curate at Lythe, 1871 
Vicar of Worsley with Ellenbrook Chapel, Lancashire, 1872 – 1890
Commissary for the Anglican Diocese of New Westminster, 1879 – 1897
Chaplain to All Saints’ Church, San Remo, Italy, 1884 – 1893
Chaplain to the Archbishop of York, 1891 – 1897
Chaplain to York Lay Readers, 1910

He was appointed to the ninth stall in St George's Chapel, Windsor Castle in 1891, a position he held until he resigned in 1907.

Notes 

1846 births
1932 deaths
Canons of Windsor
Ordained peers
Alumni of Durham University
Deputy Lieutenants of the North Riding of Yorkshire
Clergy from Yorkshire
People from Whitby
Constantine|Constantine, 3rd Marquess of Normanby
3